The 1900 United States presidential election in Illinois took place on November 6, 1900. All contemporary 45 states were part of the 1900 United States presidential election. State voters chose 24 electors to the Electoral College, which selected the president and vice president.

Illinois was won by the Republican nominees, incumbent President William McKinley of Ohio and his running mate Theodore Roosevelt of New York. It was the tipping-point-state in the 1900 presidential election.

Results

See also
 United States presidential elections in Illinois

Notes

References

Illinois
1900
1900 Illinois elections